Kielder railway station is a closed railway station that served the village hamlet of Kielder, Northumberland.

History

Kielder railway station was on the Border Counties Railway which linked the Newcastle and Carlisle Railway, near Hexham, with the Border Union Railway at Riccarton Junction. The first section of the route was opened between Hexham and Chollerford in 1858, the remainder opening in 1862. The line was closed to passengers by British Railways in 1956.

The station had a single platform and a stone built station building in the form of two semi-detached cottages. A signal box was added in the late 1800s, causing the platform to be shortened by ten yards.

The station building, now two private houses, still stands near the 'Station Garage'.

References

External links
Kielder Station on Disused Stations
Kielder Station on a navigable 1955 O. S. map

Disused railway stations in Northumberland
Former North British Railway stations
Railway stations in Great Britain opened in 1862
Railway stations in Great Britain closed in 1956
1861 establishments in England